This is a list of political parties that were created to primarily represent the interests of the LGBT population in the nation in which each political party was registered.

 Ladlad (Philippines)
 Magi ( – Israel)
 Embrace Diversity Political Movement (South Africa)
 Gay Party (Italy)
Australian Equality Party (Marriage)

 
Political parties